Dmitry Dmitriyevich Poloz (born 12 July 1991) is a Russian professional footballer who plays as a winger or second striker for FC Rostov.

Club career
Poloz was born in Stavropol. He began to play football for his hometown club Dynamo Stavropol and joined the youth ranks of Lokomotiv Moscow in 2008. On 15 July 2009, he made his professional debut for Lokomotiv Moscow in a 1-2 away loss to SKA-Energiya Khabarovsk in the Russian Cup.

Rostov
On 10 January 2012, Poloz signed a three-year contract with Russian Premier League club Rostov. On 17 March 2012, he made his debut for a new club in a league game against Terek Grozny. On 7 December 2012, he scored his first league goal in a 2–3 home loss to Krasnodar.

Zenit St Petersburg
On 28 June 2017, Poloz signed a three-year contract with FC Zenit Saint Petersburg.

Loan to Rubin Kazan
On 26 July 2018, he joined FC Rubin Kazan on loan for the 2018–19 season.

Sochi
On 4 July 2019, he moved to PFC Sochi.

Return to Rostov
On 23 August 2020, he returned to FC Rostov in exchange for Ivelin Popov. On 28 November 2020, he scored the first hat-trick of his career in a 4–1 victory over FC Dynamo Moscow, two of his goals were from the penalty spot.

International career
On 3 September 2014, Poloz made his national team debut in a friendly against Azerbaijan.

On 11 May 2018, he was included in Russia's extended 2018 FIFA World Cup squad as a back-up. He was not included in the finalized World Cup squad.

Career statistics

Club

International

International goals
Scores and results list Russia's goal tally first.

Honours
Rostov
Russian Cup: 2013–14

References

External links
 FC Rostov profile 
 

1991 births
Sportspeople from Stavropol
Living people
Russian footballers
Russia youth international footballers
Russia under-21 international footballers
Russia national football B team footballers
Russia international footballers
Association football wingers
Association football forwards
FC Lokomotiv Moscow players
FC Rostov players
FC Zenit Saint Petersburg players
FC Rubin Kazan players
PFC Sochi players
Russian Premier League players
2017 FIFA Confederations Cup players